Maria Klenskaja (29 January 1951 – 6 January 2022) was an Estonian actress.

Early life and career
Klenskaja was born in Tartu, of Russian parentage. From 1968 until 1970, she worked in the Estonian State Youth Theatre in Tallinn as a make-up artist and in the prop department. In 1974 she graduated from the Tallinn State Conservatory's Performing Arts Department. Since 1974 she had been a contracted actress at the Estonian Drama Theatre. She was also engaged as an actress at the Vanalinnastuudio for one year, beginning in 1989.

Besides theatre roles she had also had a successful film career and has appeared on television and in radio theatre.

Personal life and death
Klenskaja was in a relationship with actor Aarne Üksküla for over thirty years, until his death in 2017. Klenskaja died on 6 January 2022, aged 70, following a prolonged illness.

Awards
 1986: Meritorious Artist of the Soviet Union
 2002: Order of the White Star, IV Class

Selected filmography

 1985: Naerata ometi
 1989: Äratus
 1990: Sügis 
 1991: Rahu tänav
 1995: Wikmani poisid (TV miniseries)
 2006: Vägev võlur
 2006–2007: Ohtlik lend (TV series)
 2006: Vana daami visiit
 2007: Georg 
 2015: Vehkleja 
 2018: Seltsimees laps
 2020: Vee peal

References

1951 births
2022 deaths
20th-century Estonian actresses
21st-century Estonian actresses
Estonian stage actresses
Estonian film actresses
Estonian television actresses
Estonian radio actresses
Recipients of the Order of the White Star, 4th Class
Estonian Academy of Music and Theatre alumni
Estonian people of Russian descent
Actresses from Tartu

External links